The Francois Cousin House at 28061 Main St., Lacombe, Louisiana that appears to have been built in c.1790.  It was listed on the National Register of Historic Places in 2002.

It is a one-and-one-half-story French Creole cottage on the west bank of Liberty Bayou.  It was expanded at the rear in the late nineteenth or early twentieth century.

References

Houses completed in 1820
Creole architecture in Louisiana
Houses on the National Register of Historic Places in Louisiana
Houses in St. Tammany Parish, Louisiana
National Register of Historic Places in St. Tammany Parish, Louisiana